Maels Rodríguez Corrales (born October 15, 1979) is a Cuban baseball player and Olympic silver medalist.
He set the Cuban National Series record for strikeouts in one season after he struck out 263 players in just 178.1 innings of play during the 2000–2001 Cuban National Series season. In that season he won 15 games while also leading in walks granted with 76. He led the Gallos de Sancti Spiritus to the playoffs that year and was eventually awarded the Cuban National Series Most Valuable Player Award, the second player from that team to ever win the award.

In six seasons of play in Cuba he went 65-45, having 1,148 strikeouts in 938 innings of work while having a 2.29 ERA. He allowed a batting average of .177. He attempted to defect from Cuba to play in Major League Baseball, but a subsequent arm injury derailed his chances. He was the second pitcher in Cuban player history to throw 100 mph or more and his mark of 100.5 mph; Aroldis Chapman is the only pitcher with a higher mark, having thrown 101.2 miles per hour.

References 
 
 

1979 births
Living people
Defecting Cuban baseball players
Olympic baseball players of Cuba
Olympic silver medalists for Cuba
Olympic medalists in baseball
Medalists at the 2000 Summer Olympics
Baseball players at the 2000 Summer Olympics
Pan American Games gold medalists for Cuba
Baseball players at the 1999 Pan American Games
Pan American Games medalists in baseball
Medalists at the 1999 Pan American Games
20th-century Cuban people